Roddis Franklin "Pete" Drake (October 8, 1932 – July 29, 1988), was a Nashville-based American record producer and pedal steel guitar player. One of the most sought-after backup musicians of the 1960s, Drake played on such hits as Lynn Anderson's "Rose Garden", Charlie Rich's "Behind Closed Doors", Bob Dylan's "Lay Lady Lay", and Tammy Wynette's "Stand by Your Man". Drake was inducted into the Country Music Hall of Fame in 2022, 33 years after his death.

Career
Drake was born in Augusta, Georgia, the son of a Pentecostal preacher. In 1950, he drove to Nashville, heard Jerry Byrd on the Grand Ole Opry, and was inspired to buy a steel guitar. Later in the 1950s, he organized the country music band Sons of the South in Atlanta, Georgia, which included future country stars like Jerry Reed, Doug Kershaw, Roger Miller, Jack Greene, and Joe South.

In 1959, he moved to Nashville, joined the Nashville A-Team, and went on the road as a backup musician for Don Gibson, Marty Robbins, and others. In 1964 he had an international hit on Smash Records with his "talking steel guitar" playing on Bill Anderson's 1963 album Still.

The single "Forever" charted in March 1964 and reached No. 25 in the Billboard Hot 100, eventually sold over one million copies, and was awarded a gold disc. His innovative use of what would be called the talk box, later used by Peter Frampton, Joe Walsh, Roger Troutman and Jeff Beck, added novel effects to the pedal steel guitar. The album Pete Drake and His Talking Steel Guitar, harkened back to the sounds of Alvino Rey and his wife Luise King, who first modulated a guitar tone with the signal from a throat microphone in 1939. The unique sound of the talk box with a steel guitar was new in the 1960s, and it made the sounds of vocalizing along with the strings of the steel guitar. According to an interview of Drake:

The equipment was only loud enough to be useful in the studio for recordings.

Drake played on Bob Dylan's three albums recorded in Nashville, including Nashville Skyline, and on Joan Baez's David's Album.  He also worked with George Harrison  on All Things Must Pass, and produced Ringo Starr on Beaucoups of Blues in 1970.

Drake produced albums for many other musicians, and founded Stop Records and First Generation Records. He was inducted into the Country Music Hall of Fame's Walkway of Stars in 1970 and the Steel Guitar Hall of Fame in 1987 and into the Georgia Music Hall of Fame in 2010. On May 1, 2022, Drake was one of four inductees into the Country Music Hall of Fame for the year 2021 along with Ray Charles, The Judds, and Eddie Bayers.

Death
Developing emphysema after four decades of smoking, Drake's health began declining in 1985. The Drakes built a recording studio in their home in Brentwood, Tennessee, where he died on July 29, 1988, at the age of 55. He is buried in Spring Hill Cemetery in Nashville with an inscription that reads "His Courage, His Smile, His Talent and His Love, Warms Our Hearts" and "For Pete's Sake."

References

External links
 PeteDrakeMusic.com — Official web site, including bio, credits, timeline, photos, videos, and store
 Pete Drake - It Shore Ain't No Vocoder - Pete Drake on Record Robot
 Davies, Phil. Pete Drake
 First Generation Records @ CountryRecords.com
 [ Pete Drake Biography] by Craig Harris @ Allmusic
 Old video of talking electric guitar
 
 A version of "Forever", performed live it looks like, on YouTube Forever (live) - Pete Drake

1932 births
1988 deaths
Musicians from Augusta, Georgia
Musicians from Nashville, Tennessee
Pedal steel guitarists
Guitarists from Tennessee
Guitarists from Georgia (U.S. state)
American country guitarists
Record producers from Georgia (U.S. state)
Record producers from Tennessee
American session musicians
Starday Records artists
Smash Records artists
Deaths from emphysema
20th-century American businesspeople
20th-century American guitarists
Country musicians from Tennessee
Country musicians from Georgia (U.S. state)